HD 215497 c is an extrasolar planet which orbits the G-type main sequence star HD 215497, located approximately 142 light years away in the constellation Tucana. This planet has at least one-thirds the mass of Jupiter and takes 568 days to orbit the star at a semimajor axis of 1.282 AU. This planet was detected by HARPS on October 19, 2009, together with 29 other planets, including HD 215497 b.

References

Exoplanets discovered in 2009
Exoplanets detected by radial velocity
Giant planets
Tucana (constellation)